Andy Roddick did not defend his title as he had retired from professional tennis in September 2012.

John Isner won the title after two previous final appearances, defeating Kevin Anderson in the final, 6–7(3–7), 7–6(7–2), 7–6(7–2).

Seeds
The top four seeds receive a bye into the second round.

Draw

Finals

Top half

Bottom half

Qualifying

Seeds

Qualifiers

Qualifying draw

First qualifier

Second qualifier

Third qualifier

Fourth qualifier

References
Main Draw
Qualifying Draw

2013 ATP World Tour
2013 Singles